Thomas Wykes (died c. 1430), of Stetchworth, Cambridgeshire, was an English politician.

He was a Member (MP) of the Parliament of England for Cambridgeshire in March 1416.

References

14th-century births
1430 deaths
People from East Cambridgeshire District
English MPs March 1416